Steven Kim Book (born 7 July 1969) is an English former professional football goalkeeper who is currently employed as the goalkeeping coach at Cheltenham Town.

Book represented a number of clubs in the English football league system during a career which began in 1988 at Welton Rovers and concluded with a two-year stint as player-goalkeeping coach at Cheltenham Town between 2010 and 2012. He then retired from playing to focus on coaching at Cheltenham Town.

Early career
The son of a former professional goalkeeper, Kim Book, and nephew of the former Manchester City manager Tony Book, Steve began his career on the South-West non-league circuit with clubs such as Paulton Rovers, Welton Rovers, Frome Town and Weston-super-Mare. He moved on to Bath City and spent the initial part of the 1993/4 at Brighton without breaking into the first team though he did make a couple of appearances for Slough Town whilst on loan there. A change of management saw him return to the non-league scene with Frome Town before a period at Lincoln City where he was an unused substitute in a couple of League Cup ties in the 1994/95 season.

Forest Green Rovers
In September 1994 he joined Forest Green Rovers. Although his number of appearances are unknown, he spent three years at the Nailsworth club before an £8,000 transfer took him to Cheltenham Town in July 1997.

Cheltenham Town
He was the first choice goalkeeper at Cheltenham for seven years, leading them to promotion into the League, a F A Trophy win, then into Nationwide Division 2 via the playoffs in 2002. His career at Cheltenham also seen him win England semi-pro honours and The Conference Team of the year 98–99. 

He left Cheltenham in the summer of 2004 and joined Swindon Town.

Swindon Town, Bristol Rovers and Non-League
In July 2005, and without a professional club, the Emerson's Green-based Book linked up with Bristol Rovers for training and also to assist coaching the club's younger goalkeepers. On 16 August 2005 he was appointed goalkeeping coach at Bristol Rovers on a permanent basis, succeeding Phil Kite in the role to allow Kite to concentrate fully on his role as physio. Book combined his coaching role with a playing role with Cirencester Town, debuting for the club in the 2–0 Southern Football League Premier Division victory at Chesham United on 13 August 2005. He made twelve league appearances for the club, the final one in a 1–0 defeat at Aylesbury United on 22 November 2005, before leaving the club and signing non-contract terms with Bristol Rovers where he was given the squad number 25.

As a player, he joined Mangotsfield in the summer of 2006 and on 26 August scored the first goal of his career when a sliced free-kick from his own area managed to outfox the Rugby Town goalkeeper. In June 2007, he departed the club by mutual consent after being told he didn't figure in the plans of newly appointed manager Frank Gregan.

In 2008, he joined Southern League Premier Division side Tiverton Town. Is still goalkeeping coach at Bristol Rovers and holds the level two coaching badge, UEFA C goalkeeping and UEFA B goalkeeping licence. On 10 June 2010, he agreed to join his former club Cheltenham Town as a part-time goalkeeping coach. At this time, Steve Book was given the worst ever Fifa Ultimate Team rating at 40 on Fifa 12 and he is still the worst to date. In August 2011, at the age of 42, Book was again registered as a goalkeeper at Cheltenham for a League Cup match against MK Dons where he sat on the bench.

Career statistics

Playing honours

Cheltenham Town
 FA Trophy winners: 1997–98
 Football Conference runners-up: 1997–98
 Football Conference winners: 1998–99
 Third Division play-off winners: 2001–02

Tiverton Town
 Devon St. Luke's Cup Final runners-up 2008–2009

Coaching honours

Cheltenham Town
 Vanarama National League Winners: 2015-16
League Two Champions: 2020-21

References

1969 births
Living people
Footballers from Bournemouth
English footballers
England semi-pro international footballers
Association football goalkeepers
Welton Rovers F.C. players
Paulton Rovers F.C. players
Frome Town F.C. players
Weston-super-Mare A.F.C. players
Bath City F.C. players
Brighton & Hove Albion F.C. players
Slough Town F.C. players
Lincoln City F.C. players
Forest Green Rovers F.C. players
Cheltenham Town F.C. players
Swindon Town F.C. players
Cirencester Town F.C. players
Gloucester City A.F.C. players
Bristol Rovers F.C. players
Mangotsfield United F.C. players
Tiverton Town F.C. players
English Football League players
National League (English football) players
Cheltenham Town F.C. non-playing staff